Makerua railway station was a station in Horowhenua District on the North Island Main Trunk in New Zealand. Only a single track now passes through the station site.

History 

Makerua was opened as a flag station by the Wellington and Manawatu Railway Company on Monday 2 August 1886, when trains started to run between Longburn and Ōtaki, though a special train had run from Longburn to Ohau in April 1886. The first through train from Wellington to Palmerston North ran on 30 November 1886. Makerua didn't appear in timetables until 1888. Palmerston to Wellington trains started to call at the station from 1910.

In 1889 a new siding and platform were built at Makerua. By 1911 it had a shelter shed, platform and a loop for 16 wagons. From 1929 a tablet was used. A new station was built in 1946.

The Makerua Swamp was to the north west of the railway, where  of tramway had been laid by 1903. There were also many other flax mills in the area.

Trains were blown off the lines at Makerua in 1916 and in 1936, when the shelter shed was also blown over. An anemometer installed at Shannon in 1937 now checks wind speeds.

On 23 October 1966, or 1967 Makaroa closed to all traffic.

References

External links 
Auckland Weekly News photos - 1936 Railway carriages blown off the line by the force of the wind at Makerua and Miranui Flaxmill in 1909
Miranui Tramway
1:50,000 map

Defunct railway stations in New Zealand
Buildings and structures in Manawatū-Whanganui
Rail transport in Manawatū-Whanganui
Railway stations opened in 1886
Railway stations closed in 1966
Horowhenua District